Tereza Yohannes (born 1982 in Shoa) is an Ethiopian long-distance runner.

At the 2003 World Cross Country Championships she finished ninth in the long race, while the Ethiopian team, of which Yohannes was a part, won the gold medal in the team competition.

Personal bests
3000 metres - 9:13.24 min (2002)
5000 metres - 15:45.04 min (2001)
10,000 metres - 33:04.73 min (2000)
Half marathon - 1:13:38 hrs (1999)

External links

1982 births
Living people
Ethiopian female long-distance runners
Ethiopian female cross country runners
20th-century Ethiopian women
21st-century Ethiopian women